The canton of Annœullin is an administrative division of the Nord department, northern France. It was created at the French canton reorganisation which came into effect in March 2015. Its seat is in Annœullin.

It consists of the following communes:

Allennes-les-Marais
Annœullin
Aubers
La Bassée
Bauvin
Camphin-en-Carembault
Carnin
Don
Fournes-en-Weppes
Fromelles
Hantay
Herlies
Illies
Le Maisnil
Marquillies
Ostricourt
Phalempin
Provin
Radinghem-en-Weppes
Sainghin-en-Weppes
Salomé
Wahagnies
Wavrin
Wicres

References

Cantons of Nord (French department)